= Francesca Uriri =

Nigerian social entrepreneur

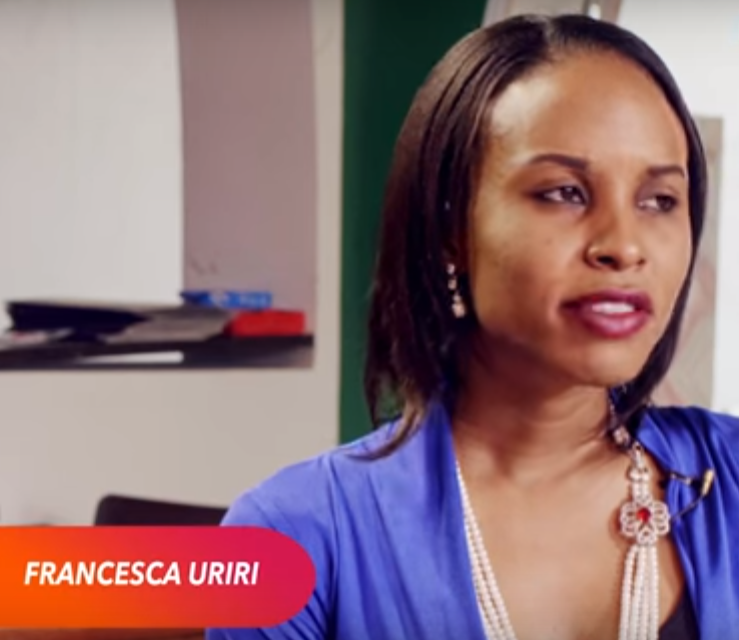

Francesca Onomarie Uriri is a Nigerian social entrepreneur.

== Entrepreneurship ==
She is the founder of a non-profit Leading Ladies Africa, which aims at providing skills to African women necessary for their success and promoting gender inclusion.

Leading Ladies Africa, through its Enterprise and Leadership Program (ELP), has supported 5000 female entrepreneurs to receive direct training, coaching and funding for their businesses.

== Employment at Uber ==
As of 2018, she served as the Head of Communications in West Africa for Uber. In 2019 she became Uber's Internal Communications Lead For People, Culture And Diversity In San Francisco.
